Ron Steele may refer to:

 Ron Steele (news anchor), American local news anchor
 Ron Steele (ski jumper), American former ski jumper